Malikpur or Malik Pur may refer to:

 Malikpur, Gujrat
 Malikpur, Jhajjar
 Malik Pur, Buner
 Malik Pur, Mansehra

See also 
 Malikipuram
 Malikpura Urban
 Mallickpurhat railway station